Broken Hills is a ghost town in Mineral County, Nevada. It was primarily the site of the mining operation of miners, Joseph Arthur and James Stratford from 1913 to 1920. The settlement reached the height of popularity during World War I.

History
Broken Hills was founded by two Englishmen, Joseph Arthur and James Stratford, who discovered silver-lead ore at the site in 1913. A rush of miners to the area in the following six months was halted when it was discovered that Arthur and Stratford had claimed the most promising sites.

Broken Hills reached the height of population, with a few hundred residents, from 1915 to 1920. The town had stores, a hotel, saloons and a school.
By 1920, both Arthur and Stratford's mining efforts only produced . Arthur and Stratford then sold their claims to George Graham Rice, who promoted the mine and sold shares of property. Rice invested  of stockholder money into the mine to produce only  of revenue. Other mining companies in the area also failed.

In 1926, there was a silver rush to the Quartz Mountains nearby, and the post office and a few stores at Broken Hill reopened. After 1928, the settlement declined again, but mining continued in a limited away.

The post office was in operation from December 1920 until October 1921 and then from June 1926 until February 1935.

See also
 List of ghost towns in Nevada

References

Ghost towns in Mineral County, Nevada
Populated places established in 1913
Ghost towns in Nevada
1913 establishments in Nevada